Teseo Ambrogio degli Albonesi (Theseus Ambrosius, 1469–1540) was an Italian humanist. He was a proponent of Christian Kabbalah and an early student of Semitic languages. His Introductio ad Chaldaicam linguam, Syriacam, atque Armenicam, et decem alias linguas (Pavia 1539) was one of the earliest Western studies of Syriac and Armenian. The bulk of the work consists of an Introduction to Chaldean, Syriac and Armenian (foll. 9–192). To this is added an Appendix which includes the presentation of alphabets (foll. 193–213), including brief references to Coptic (called "Jacobite") and Ethiopic (misleadingly called "Indian") and comments on the ancestry of European languages, especially languages of Italy, with a discussion of Etruscan.

Works
 Introductio ad Chaldaicam linguam, Syriacam, atque Armenicam, et decem alias linguas, Pavia (1539); archive.org.  Google Books.

References

Fiano, Emanuel A., "Teseo Ambrogio degli Albonesi" in Gorgias Encyclopedic Dictionary of the Syriac Heritage: Electronic Edition. Edited by Sebastian P. Brock, Aaron M. Butts, George A. Kiraz and Lucas Van Rompay. Digital edition prepared by David Michelson, Ute Possekel, and Daniel L. Schwartz. Gorgias Press, 2011; online ed. Beth Mardutho, 2018. https://gedsh.bethmardutho.org/Albonesi-Teseo-Ambrogio-degli.
Wilkinson, R.J., "Teseo Ambrogio and the Maronite Delegation to the Fifth Lateran Council"  in Orientalism, Aramaic and Kabbalah in the Catholic Reformation (2007), 11–28.
Virgil B. Strohmeyer, The importance of Teseo Ambrogio degli Albonesi's selected Armenian materials for the development of the renaissance's perennial philosophy and an armenological philosophical tradition (1998)

1469 births
1540 deaths
Italian Renaissance humanists
16th-century linguists
Christian Kabbalists